Sergei Timofeyevich Belous (born 25 September 1970) is a former Russian football player.

He played for the main squad of PFC CSKA Moscow in the USSR Federation Cup.

References

1970 births
Living people
Soviet footballers
FC Spartak-UGP Anapa players
FC Kuban Krasnodar players
PFC CSKA Moscow players
Russian footballers
Russian Premier League players
FC Torpedo NN Nizhny Novgorod players
Association football defenders